The 2024 United States presidential election in California is scheduled to take place on Tuesday, November 5, 2024, as part of the 2024 United States elections in which all 50 states plus the District of Columbia will participate. California voters will choose electors to represent them in the Electoral College via a popular vote. The state of California has 54 electoral votes in the Electoral College.

Primary elections

Democratic primary

Primary polling

Republican primary 

The California Republican primary is scheduled to be held on Super Tuesday, March 5, 2024.

General election

Polling
Joe Biden vs. Donald Trump

Joe Biden vs. Ron DeSantis

Gavin Newsom vs. Ron DeSantis

See also
 United States presidential elections in California
 2024 United States presidential election
 2024 Democratic Party presidential primaries
 2024 Republican Party presidential primaries
 2024 United States elections

Notes

References

California
2024
Presidential